Laurent Dufaux (born 20 May 1969 in Montreux, Switzerland) is a former professional road cyclist from 1991 to 2004. He was the Swiss National Road Race champion in 1991.

Major results

1990
 9th Giro dell'Emilia
1991
 1st  Road race, National Road Championships
 1st  Overall Route du Sud
 1st Coppa Placci
 2nd Giro del Lazio
 4th Tour du Nord–Ouest
 5th Overall Tour de Romandie
 7th Grand Prix Pino Cerami
 7th Trofeo Laigueglia
1992
 1st Grand Prix Pino Cerami
 3rd Tour de Berne
 5th Overall Étoile de Bessèges
 6th Overall Critérium du Dauphiné Libéré
 6th Overall Tour de Romandie
 6th Overall Tour of Galicia
 6th Overall Euskal Bizikleta
 6th Classique des Alpes
 7th GP Ouest–France
1993
 1st  Overall Critérium du Dauphiné Libéré
1st Stage 5 
 2nd Gran Piemonte
 3rd Overall Vuelta a Burgos
 3rd Overall Setmana Catalana de Ciclisme
 5th Classique des Alpes
 7th Overall Vuelta a Murcia
1994
 1st  Overall Critérium du Dauphiné Libéré
 2nd Overall Setmana Catalana de Ciclisme
 5th Overall Tour of the Basque Country
 5th Leeds International Classic
 7th Classique des Alpes
 9th Overall Tour de l'Oise
1st Stage 2 
1995
 1st  Overall Route du Sud
 1st  Overall Vuelta a Burgos
1st  Points classification
1st Stages 3 & 4a
1996
 2nd Overall Vuelta a España
1st Stage 19
 3rd À travers Lausanne
 4th Overall Tour de France
1st Stage 17
 6th Overall Setmana Catalana de Ciclisme
 7th Trofeo Luis Puig
 8th Overall Grand Prix du Midi Libre
 10th Overall Critérium du Dauphiné Libéré
1997
 1st  Overall À travers Lausanne
1st Stages 1 (ITT) & 2 (ITT)
 1st Stage 2 Grand Prix du Midi Libre
 2nd Overall Paris–Nice
 3rd Overall Vuelta a España
 6th Road race, UCI Road World Championships
 6th Overall Vuelta a Burgos
 9th Overall Tour de France
1998
 1st  Overall Tour de Romandie
1st Prologue, Stages 1 & 3 
 1st  Overall Midi Libre
1st Stage 5 
 4th Overall À travers Lausanne
 7th Amstel Gold Race
 8th Overall Paris–Nice
 9th La Flèche Wallonne
 10th Liège–Bastogne–Liège
1999
 1st Polynormande
 2nd À travers Lausanne
 3rd Overall Vuelta a Burgos
 4th Overall Tour de France
 4th Overall Tour de Suisse
 4th Overall Grand Prix du Midi Libre
 5th Road race, National Road Championships
2000
 1st Züri-Metzgete
 3rd Overall Tour de Romandie
 3rd À travers Lausanne
 3rd Grand Prix Gippingen
 5th Coppa Ugo Agostoni
 6th Amstel Gold Race
 9th Overall Deutschland Tour
2001 
 1st Stage 3 Giro del Trentino
 3rd À travers Lausanne
 4th Tre Valli Varesine
 6th Road race, National Road Championships
 9th Giro del Lazio
2002
 1st Trofeo Melinda
 2nd Giro del Veneto
 3rd Tre Valli Varesine
 4th Overall Tour de Suisse
 4th Overall Giro Riviera Ligure Ponente
 6th Grand Prix Gippingen
 9th Clásica de San Sebastián
 10th Züri-Metzgete
 10th Giro dell'Appennino
2003
 2nd Overall Tour de Romandie
1st Stage 3
 5th Classique des Alpes
2004 
 9th Road race, National Road Championships

Grand Tour general classification results timeline
Source:

See also
 List of doping cases in cycling
 List of sportspeople sanctioned for doping offences

References

External links

Official Tour de France results for Laurent Dufaux

1969 births
Living people
Swiss male cyclists
Swiss sportspeople in doping cases
Olympic cyclists of Switzerland
Cyclists at the 2000 Summer Olympics
Doping cases in cycling
Swiss Tour de France stage winners
People from Montreux
Sportspeople from the canton of Vaud
20th-century Swiss people
21st-century Swiss people